The bibliography of the Austrian author Leopold von Sacher-Masoch (1836—1895) includes a complete, exhaustive list of original books published during the author's lifetime.

1857
Der Aufstand in Gent unter Kaiser Carl V. Schaffhausen: Fr. Hurter, 1857
1858
Eine galizische Geschichte 1846., 1858 [= Graf Donski. Eine galizische Geschichte. Schaffhausen, 1864; 2. Aufl.]
1862
Ungarns Untergang und Maria von Österreich. Leipzig: Weigel, 1862
1863
Der Emissär. Eine galizische Geschichte. Prag: Credner, 1863
Polnische Revolutionen. Erinnerungen aus Galizien. 1863
1864
Die Verse Friedrichs des Grossen. Schaffhausen: Fr. Hurter, 1864
1865
 Kaunitz. Kulturhistorischer Roman. 1865 [neue Ausgabe = Bern: Georg Frobeen, 1877]
1867
Der letzte König der Magyaren. Historischer Roman. Jena, 1867
1870
Die geschiedene Frau. Passionsgeschichte eines Idealisten. Leipzig, 1870 (2 Bde)
Das Vermächtnis Kains: I. Die Liebe. Stuttgart: Kotta(?), 1870 (2 Bde)
1872
Zur Ehre Gottes! Leipzig: Adolph Schumann, 1872 (Berlin: Neufeld & Henius?)
1873
Falscher Hermelin. 1873 (1873-79?)
Ein weiblicher Sultan. Historischer Roman. (Berlin: Paul Franke ???) 1873
Die Messalinen Wiens. Geschichten aus der guten Gesellschaft. 1873 (1874?)
Über den Wert der Kritik. Erfahrungen und Bemerkungen. Leipzig: E.J. Günther, 1873
(?)Soziale Schattenbilder: Aus den Memoiren eines österreichischen Polizeibeamten. Halle: Gesenius, 1873
Gute Menschen und ihre Geschichten. Leipzig: Poketer, 1873 (?)
1873-1874
Russische Hofgeschichten. (4 Bde)
1873-1877
Wiener Hofgeschichten. (2 Bde)
1874
Die Asthetik des Hässlichen. 1874
1875
Die Ideale unserer Zeit. Roman 4 Bde. Bern, 1875 (1876?)
Galizische Geschichten.* Leipzig: E.J. Günther, 1875 [2 Aufl.(?) = Bern: G. Frobeen & Cie, 1877]
1877
Der Mann ohne Vorurteil. Zurich: Georg Frobeen, 1877
Das Vermächtnis Kains: II. Das Eigentum. Bern: Georg Frobeen, 1877 (2 Bde)
1878
Der neue Hiob. Stuttgart, 1878
Judengeschichten. Leipzig: Harthock, 1878
Die Republik der Weiberfeinde. Leipzig, 1878
1879
 Silhouetten. Leipzig: Schulze, 1879 ???
1881
Neue Judengeschichten. 1881
1883
Die Gottesmutter. Leipzig, 1883
1885
(?)Mein Freund Wodakoski. Prag, 1885
1886
Die Seelenfängerin. 1886
Ewige Jugend. 1886
Polnische Ghetto-Geschichten. München, 1886
Kleine Mysterien der Weltgeschichte. Leipzig–Reudnitz: Oswald Schmidt, 1886 [2. Auflage]
1887
Polnische Geschichten. Breslau: Schottländer, 1887
1890
Die Schlange im Paradies. Russischer Sittenroman in 3 Bänden. Mannheim: J. Bensheim, 1890 (3 Bde)
1891
Die Einsamen. Mannheim: J. Bensheimer, 1891
1892
Jüdische Leben in Wort und Bild. Mannheim: J. Bensheimer, 1892
1893
Bühnenzauber. 1893
1894
Liebesgeschichten. Berlin: Neufeld & Henius, 1894
Die Satten und die Hungrigen. Berlin: Schreiter, 1894

Posthumous editions
1898
Entre nous. Berlin–Leipzig: Hillger, 1898
1900
Katherina II. Berlin: Th. Knaur/Schreiter, 1900 (?)
1901
Afrikas Semiramis. Hg. C.F. von Schlichtegroll. Dresden, 1901
Grausame Frauen. Hinterlassene Novellen. Bd. I. Dresden, 1901

Bibliographies by writer
Bibliographies of Austrian writers
Journalism bibliographies